Operation Essex was an operation by the 2nd Battalion, 5th Marines in "Antenna Valley", Hiệp Đức District south of An Hoa Combat Base from 6 to 17 November 1967.

Background
Essex was planned as a continuation of Operation Swift designed to push People's Army of Vietnam (PAVN) and Viet Cong (VC) units operating in the area into US Army units conducting Operation Wheeler/Wallowa in the Hiệp Đức District-Quế Sơn Valley.

Operation
On the morning of 6 November 2/5 Marines was landed by helicopter in Antenna Valley. Company H was proceeding towards its objective, the village of Ap Bon 2 in the northeast of the valley when it was ambushed by an entrenched PAVN unit. The Company commander ordered his 2nd platoon to outflank the PAVN ambush but they were also ambushed west of the village losing 2 Marines killed and withdrew back to the Company position. Air and artillery strikes were called in and then the 1st and 3rd platoons assaulted the village however they made little progress against the well-entrenched PAVN. At 16:00 Company F arrived to reinforce Company H and launched a fresh attack on Ap Bon (2) but was also repulsed. At dusk both Marine companies withdrew and established a night defensive position which the PAVN hit with mortar and machine gun fire until 04:30 on 7 November when they withdrew. At dawn the Marines attacked Ap Bon (2), but found it deserted with most of the bunkers and fighting positions destroyed by airstrikes and artillery fire. The Marines had lost 16 killed in the fighting.

On 10 November 2/5 Marines captured a PAVN officer cadet who had been at Ap Bon (2) who revealed that the village had contained a battalion headquarters which had been destroyed by bombing killing the battalion commander and over 60 soldiers with many more wounded.

Aftermath
The operation concluded on 17 November.

References

1967 in Vietnam
Essex
Essex
Battles of the Vietnam War involving the United States
United States Marine Corps in the Vietnam War
Battles and operations of the Vietnam War in 1967
History of Quảng Nam province